= Rugby football positions =

Rugby football positions may refer to:

- Rugby league positions
- Rugby union positions
